Kurt Roberts (born February 20, 1988) is an American track and field athlete who competes in the shot put. He set his personal record for the event in 2014, throwing  to take second at the USA Indoor Track and Field Championships.

He was a late starter in the sport and competed in NCAA Division II competition with Ashland University. He won once at the NCAA Men's Division II Outdoor Track and Field Championships and two titles at the NCAA DII Indoor Championships. He was the gold medallist at the 2010 NACAC Under-23 Championships in Athletics.

Biography

Early life and college
Born in Lancaster, Ohio, he attended Athens High School and began to compete in the shot put around the age of sixteen. He progressively became more serious about the sport as he got older. He attended Ashland University and competed for the Ashland Eagles in NCAA Division II.

Roberts achieved the best mark ever for an NCAA Division II athlete when he won the NCAA DII Indoor title with a put of  – a mark which ranked him second among American collegians that season. He was only third at the NCAA outdoor meet. He made his national debut at the 2010 USA Outdoor Track and Field Championships, taking 15th place. He also made his international debut and won a gold medal at the 2010 NACAC Under-23 Championships in Athletics. He retained his NCAA indoor title the following year, but failed to record a valid mark at the outdoor meet. He threw over twenty metres for the first time at the beginning of 2011 and his mark of  ranked him in the top ten nationally that year.

Professional
Roberts began to shot put professionally in 2012. He competed at the USA Indoor Track and Field Championships and placed eighth. Outdoors he rapidly improved, throwing  and then  (the latter performance placed him tenth in the world in the event that year). At those trials a photograph of him competing, taken mid-throw by Matt Slocum for the Associated Press, gained widespread coverage due to his unusually distorted face and gruff features. This raised the profile of the athlete, who was still supporting himself by working as a physical education teacher at an elementary school in Ohio.

Still without sponsor, he took third place at the 2013 USA Indoor Championships, throwing  to place behind Ryan Whiting and Cory Martin. He peaked too early, as he failed to record a mark at the 2013 USA Outdoor Track and Field Championships. This ranked Roberts second in the world at the point he was chosen to represent his country at the 2014 IAAF World Indoor Championships.

Personal records
Shot put (outdoors) –  (2012)
Shot put (outdoors) –  (2014)
Weight throw (indoors) –  (2009)

International competitions

References

External links

Living people
1988 births
American male shot putters
People from Lancaster, Ohio
Ashland University alumni
USA Indoor Track and Field Championships winners